Presidential elections were held in Nigeria on 12 June 1993, the first since the 1983 military coup ended the country's Second Republic. The elections was the outcome of a transitional process to civilian rule spearheaded by the military ruler, Ibrahim Badamasi Babangida. The unofficial result of the election – though not declared by the National Electoral Commission (NEC) – indicated a victory for Moshood Kashimawo Olawale Abiola of the Social Democratic Party (SDP), who defeated Bashir Tofa of the National Republican Convention (NRC). The winner of the election was thus never declared as the elections were annulled by Babangida, citing electoral irregularities. The annulment led to protests and political unrest, including the resignation of IBB and a weak interim civilian government, and culminated in the continuation of military rule in the country with Sani Abacha ascending to power as the military head of state via a bloodless coup later in the year.

Background
Major General Ibrahim Badamasi Babangida (IBB) came to power on 27 August 1985 through a palace coup which ousted Major General Muhammadu Buhari. In January 1986, Babangida and his Armed Forces Ruling Council (AFRC) initiated a transition process for the return to civilian rule, setting October 1990 as the date for this return. A decree in 1987 established the National Electoral Commission to oversee the electoral process. The IBB government also established the Political Bureau, under the chairmanship of Professor Sam Cookey, to proffer advice on this transition. The Bureau's 1987 report recommended facilitating political competition to bridge ethnic and religious divides in the country. Babangida proceeded to shift the hand-over date to 1992 stating its necessity for the transfer to civilian rule. Through Decree 25 of 1987, he banned politicians and public officials of the Second Republic from participating in political activities of the Third Republic. In May 1989, Babangida lifted the ban on political parties.

The IBB government during this period foiled coup attempts – one led by Major General Mamman Vatsa in 1987, and another in 1990 led by Major Gideon Orkar. The government was active in creating new states, with the number of states rising from 21 in September 1987 to 30 in September 1991. Local governments also increased, doubling to almost 600 by 1993. The government continued to move the date of the civilian hand-over: at one time set for January 1993, and then 27 August 1993.

Primaries and nominations
Several parties submitted applications to the NEC following the removal of restrictions on political associations, but only six were deemed by the NEC to meet its requirements. According to the NEC, it could not verify most of the claims of these associations, and they were handicapped by poor organizational structures and finances. However, in October 1989, IBB rejected these selected political parties submitted by the NEC for approval, accusing them of being ethnically and regionally polarized and riddled with factions. He went on to form two new parties in December 1989: the National Republican Convention – with right-leaning politics, and the Social Democratic Party – with left-leaning politics. The government provided the initial funding for these parties, though soon after the parties were funded through private sources. The government also provided the parties with office space, comprising 500 locations at national, state and local levels. The military government spent billions of naira on the transition, with NEC receiving a significant portion of this to conduct the elections. The government was also heavily involved in the formulation of party manifestos and constitutions. The government through the Centre for Democratic Studies trained members of the two parties on electoral techniques.

Local government elections were held in 1987 and 1991, while state government elections for houses of assembly and governorship were held in 1991 and 1992. Presidential primaries for the two parties were held in August and September 1992, but these were cancelled by Babangida citing electoral fraud. The candidates who participated in these primaries were barred from contesting again, and this included prominent figures such as Lt General (rtd.) Shehu Yar’Adua and Adamu Ciroma. During this period, IBB restructured the military government – the AFRC replaced by the National Defence and Security Council. A civilian Transitional Council was created to deal with government administrative and economic tasks. The council was led by Chief Ernest Shonekan – a prominent corporate executive from the south-west region.

The new nomination process supervised by the NEC involved a knockout contest from the local to the national level, using an open ballot system – Option A4. The nomination process resulted in the emergence of Bashir Tofa, a businessman from the north, and MKO Abiola, a multimillionaire media mogul from the south – both Muslim – as presidential candidates for the NRC and SDP respectively. There was a perception that both candidates had close ties to the military, and therefore their election would not disfavor the military even in a civilian government.

In the Second Republic, both presidential candidates were involved with the ruling party – the National Party of Nigeria. Abiola had failed to secure the nomination of the NPN for the 1983 presidential elections against Shehu Shagari, the incumbent president. He had only been part of the SDP for a month when he gained the presidential ticket. Though Abiola was widely known throughout the country, Tofa was relatively unknown except in his home state of Kano.

Tofa picked as vice-president Sylvester Ugoh, a Christian from the south-east, thereby creating a regional and religious balance. Abiola also went for regional balance, picking an ex-diplomat and former Chairman of the party from the north-east, Baba Gana Kingibe as his running mate. Abiola's campaign focused on economic issues, and he was a vocal critic of the government's structural adjustment program (SAP). The Babaginda government had commenced the SAP in 1986, and following prescriptions of the International Monetary Fund and World Bank, he imposed austerity measures to ensure fiscal discipline by the state. Tofa, given his party's support of the SAP, was a less vocal critic, and focused on the effective implementation of policies in his campaign. Tofa was perceived to have closer ties with Babangida and the military: he had once suggested Babangida remain president till 2000.

Results 
On 10 June, just two days before the election, an organization with ties to the military, Association for a Better Nigeria – led by Chief Arthur Nzeribe – obtained a high court injunction against the holding of the election on the basis of alleged corruption. The chairman of the NEC, Humphrey Nwosu, dismissed the injunction citing the high court's lack of authority on election-related matters. The NEC went ahead to stage the election, which was deemed to be free and fair by observers. These observers included foreign and local journalists, delegates from the Commonwealth and other international bodies, as well as observers from the Election Monitoring Group (trained by the Centre for Democratic Studies). Voter turnout was low - about 35%. There were administrative and political problems, however no episodes of serious violence were recorded. The NEC began announcing the first batch of election results on 14 June: Abiola won 19 out of 30 states, and the Federal Capital Territory. He won all the states of the south-west; three of the seven states in the south-east; five of the nine northern states including Kano, Tofa's state; and four out of the seven states in the central middle belt. Of the 6.6 million votes that had been announced, Abiola had received 4.3 million and Tofa 2.3 million. If Abiola had been declared the winner, he would have been at that time the first southerner to be elected as president of Nigeria, breaking through ethno-religious divides having received support from all regions of the country. 

The Association for a Better Nigeria obtained another court injunction on 15 June to halt the counting and verification. This time however, the NEC accepted the injunction and announced via Radio Nigeria on 16 June that it was suspending its announcement of the results, indicating it was prohibited by a court order. The final vote was leaked on 18 June by democracy activists defying the law, revealing Abiola won by a 58% majority. On 24 June, IBB announced the annulment of the election, citing the issue of vote buying, as well as the need to protect the country's judiciary. Ahead of the elections, there were suggestions that the military leadership were uneasy about a possible presidency of Abiola and would not accept the result if he had won.

Aftermath
There were a series of violent protests in July in the south-west region following the annulment. It is estimated that security forces killed over 100 people while quelling riots. The Igbo population in Lagos were also reported to have fled to the eastern region as the tension was palpable. There was international condemnation of the annulment: the United Kingdom, United States and European Union suspended aid to Nigeria, and the Commonwealth condemned the annulment. The military government however accused foreign governments of meddling in its affairs and attempting to destabilize the country. Former military rulers Olusegun Obasanjo and Muhammadu Buhari, as well as ten other former generals – as part of the Association for Democracy and Good Governance – issued a joint statement demanding the removal of Babangida from power.

In the aftermath of the election, the government proscribed or shut down media houses, and arrested journalists. The government issued decrees preventing court cases on the annulled election. NEC's activities were terminated.

In early August, Abiola flew to London and Washington to seek international support for his presidency – he subsequently returned in 24 September. There was another wave of civil unrest in the south-west, with banks and businesses shutting down. Babangida was pressured by the Defence Council to stick to the handover date, and he therefore resigned on 26 August. The country was ruled by an Interim National Government headed by Ernest Shonekan, with Sani Abacha, a confidant of Babangida, serving as Defence Minister.

Shonekan set a date for another election in February 1994. However, his position was tenuous. He was named head of the government, but there was ambiguity on whether he also had command of the armed forces as its commander-in-chief. In early November 1993, a Lagos High Court ruled that the decree establishing the interim government was not properly signed – it was signed by Babaginda after his removal from the presidency, thus making the government illegal. The interim government had to contend with a failing economy, with debt and inflation rising and the currency weakened. Nigeria was ranked by the World Bank as among the 20 poorest in the world. To revive the economy, Shonekan resumed talks with the IMF and World Bank and the took the unpopular decision to remove subsidies on petroleum products, thereby raising the price by 700%. The Nigerian Labour Congress went on strike over the price increase. However, on 17 November 1993, Abacha toppled the interim government in a palace coup. Abacha dissolved the legislature, as well as the state and local governments, and replaced the elected civilian state governors with military and police officers. He also banned all political activities. Abacha established two governing institutions - the Provisional Ruling Council (PRC) and Federal Executive Council. Abacha's new cabinet was composed of civilian politicians, including Abiola's running mate Baba Gana Kingibe as Foreign Minister. Abacha proceeded to create a Constitutional Conference for a transition to civilian rule. The conference began on 18 January 1994, though one-third of the delegates for the conference were nominated by the government, and the PRC could veto decisions of the conference.

Abiola was arrested and charged with treason in June 1994 after he declared himself president and commander-in-chief. Abiola's arrest led to protests and strikes by workers in the petroleum sector, banking sector and academia for nine weeks. The strike by the petroleum sector paralyzed the economy. The Abacha government subsequently arrested union leaders and dismissed civilian members of his cabinet.

The government in March 1995 announced an alleged coup attempt. Olusegun Obasanjo, Shehu Musa Yar'Adua and Beko Ransome-Kuti were among those secretly tried and either sentenced to death or received lengthy prison sentences. Backlash from the international community resulted in lesser penalties - Yar'dua's death penalty and Obasanjo's life sentence were reduced.

In October 1995, Abacha set a timeframe of three years to hand over power to a civilian government. Sani Abacha died on 8 June 1998; Abiola died a month later while in detention on 7 July 1998.

Legacy 
In 2018 Muhammadu Buhari, now a civilian president of Nigeria under its Fourth Republic, declared 12 June – the date of the annulled 1993 election as the new date for the celebration of Democracy Day. The previous Democracy Day was 29 May, the date of the return to civilian rule in May 1999 following Abacha's regime.

References

Further reading
Gani Fawehinmi, The Illegality of Shonekan's Government: Lagos, Nigeria Law Publications. 1993.
T. Olagunju and S. Oyovbaire (eds), Portrait of a New Nigeria: Selected Speeches of IBB: London, Precision Press. 1989. 
African Association of Political Science, The State and Democracy in Africa: Print Holdings, Harare, Zimbabwe. 1997.  

Nigeria
1993 in Nigeria
Presidential elections in Nigeria
Annulled elections
June 1993 events in Nigeria
Election and referendum articles with incomplete results